Codoba is a monotypic genus of crustaceans belonging to the monotypic family Codobidae. The only species is Codoba discoveryi.

References

Siphonostomatoida
Monotypic crustacean genera
Copepod genera